An Evening of Magic, Live at the Hollywood Bowl is Chuck Mangione's second live album. It was released by A&M Records and re-released by Hip-O Records on CD. In addition to Mangione on flugelhorn and electric piano, it features his studio and touring band at the time, including the musicians Charles Meeks on bass guitar, Grant Geissman on guitar, James Bradley Jr. on drums, and Chris Vadala on several woodwind instruments. The band is accompanied on most tracks by a 70-piece orchestra.

Mangione played many of his popular songs such as "Feels So Good", "Main Squeeze" and "Land of Make Believe" and he also debuted music from his then forthcoming album, Children of Sanchez.

The album was nominated for the Grammy Award for Best Pop Instrumental Performance.

Track listing
All songs written by Chuck Mangione except where noted:

References

1978 live albums
A&M Records live albums
Albums recorded at the Hollywood Bowl
Chuck Mangione albums
Hip-O Records live albums
Live jazz albums